WSQL (1240 AM), also known as Q102, is a radio station located in Brevard, North Carolina broadcasting a "Greatest Hits" format.  The station is currently owned by Go Nuts Media LLC.

Q102 / WSQL Radio broadcasts 24 hours a day on 102.1 FM and 1240 AM in Brevard, North Carolina and streams a live signal worldwide via the web at www.WSQLRadio.com.

The station image is "The Home of the White Squirrel", and reflects the presence as The Voice of Transylvania County.

Daytime format is a mix of the greatest hits 1960s, 1970s and 1980s  Adult Contemporary music. The station airs local news, events, sports, and weather.  WSQL is an affiliate of CBS News Radio, the North Carolina News Network, Premiere Networks, Westwood One.

WSQL is the voice of the Brevard College Tornados, the Brevard High School Blue Devils, and the Rosman High School Tigers. The station also airs the Tar Heels games during football and basketball seasons.

The station is located at 62 W. Main St., in downtown Brevard. The live disk jockeys broadcast from the front window overlooking Main St.

WSQL Radio launched its website on August 21, 2009. The site offers two separate audio streams. One stream broadcasts 102.1 FM / 1240 AM live twenty-four hours a day, seven days a week. The second stream is used for broadcasting other live events such as Rosman High School sports and other special events.

On January 12, 2015, WSQL changed their format to greatest hits, branded as "Q102", simulcast on FM translator W271CL 102.1 FM Brevard.

Previous logo

External links
Station Website
Official Twitter
Official Facebook

SQL